Tulip poppy is a common name for several plants and may refer to:

Hunnemannia fumariifolia, native to Mexico
Papaver glaucum, native to western Asia and widely cultivated as an ornamental